The 2007 ABN AMRO World Tennis Tournament was a men's tennis tournament played on indoor hard courts. It was the 35th edition of the event known that year as the ABN AMRO World Tennis Tournament, and was part of the ATP International Series Gold of the 2007 ATP Tour. It took place at the Rotterdam Ahoy indoor sporting arena in Rotterdam, Netherlands, from 19 February through 25 February 2007. Mikhail Youzhny won the singles title.

The singles field was headlined by ATP No. 3, Australian Open quarterfinalist and 2006 Paris Masters champion Nikolay Davydenko, other Australian Open quarterfinalist and Auckland runner-up Tommy Robredo, and Doha winner and Zagreb finalist Ivan Ljubičić. Other seeded players were Sydney quarterfinalist Tomáš Berdych, Adelaide champion Novak Djokovic, David Ferrer, Lleyton Hewitt and Radek Štěpánek.

Finals

Singles

 Mikhail Youzhny defeated  Ivan Ljubičić 6–2, 6–4
It was Mikhail Youzhny's 1st title of the year, and his 3rd overall.

Doubles

 Martin Damm /  Leander Paes defeated  Andrei Pavel /  Alexander Waske 6–3, 6–7(5–7), [10–7]

References

External links
Official website

 
ABN AMRO World Tennis Tournament
ABN AMRO World Tennis Tournament
ABN AMRO World Tennis Tournament